Theodor Poeckh (20 April 1839, Braunschweig5 January 1921, Karlsruhe) was a German portrait painter.

Biography
From 1860 to 1861, he was a student of Hans Fredrik Gude at the Kunstakademie Düsseldorf. After that, he attended the Academy of Fine Arts Munich, where he studied with Carl Theodor von Piloty.

He remained in Munich, until he was appointed to a teaching position at the Academy of Fine Arts, Karlsruhe; left vacant by the death Ludwig des Coudres. Some of his best known students were Christian Wilhelm Allers, Pedro Weingärtner  and Paul Schultze-Naumburg.

The Staatliche Kunsthalle Karlsruhe has a collection of his works.

References

Further reading 
 Thieme-Becker: Poeckh, Theodor. Ausgabe Seemann 1999, Vol.25/26 pg.176
 Leo Mülfarth: Kleines Lexikon Karlsruher Maler. Karlsruhe 1987, pp. 87–88,

External links 

1839 births
1921 deaths
19th-century German painters
19th-century German male artists
German portrait painters
Artists from Braunschweig
20th-century German painters
20th-century German male artists